Lethe kabrua , the   Manipur goldenfork, is a species of Satyrinae butterfly found in the  Indomalayan realm ) where it is endemic to Manipur

Subspecies

References

kabrua
Butterflies of Asia